Omar Xavier Easy (born October 29, 1977) is a Jamaican-born American former football fullback in the National Football League. He played collegiate football at Penn State before being drafted in the fourth round of 2002 NFL Draft by the Kansas City Chiefs. He played one season for the Oakland Raiders before retiring due to knee problems.

Career

Football
Easy was named Gatorade and USA Today Massachusetts Player of the Year in 1996 while at Everett High School in Everett, Massachusetts.  As a college senior, he was the Most Valuable Player of the 2001 Blue–Gray Football Classic.
Easy suffers from exercise-induced asthma. He established the EasyWay Foundation in 2003 to benefit children with asthma.

Post-playing
From 2007 to 2009, Easy served as assistant offensive football coach and boys’ head track and field coach for his high school alma mater, Everett High School.  He received his B.A. degree in broadcast journalism in 2001 from Pennsylvania State University, which included a minor in business management.  He also received both his Master of Education (M.Ed.) in the field of education administration and his Ph.D. in educational leadership from Pennsylvania State University. Additionally, he earned a master's degree in business administration from the University of Phoenix in 2010.

In 2011, Easy was appointed director of player personnel and development in football for his college alma mater, Penn State.  In January 2012, he left that position to become vice principal of his high school alma mater Everett High School.

In 2020, Easy was selected as one of three finalists for the position of Superintendent of Public Schools for Quincy, Massachusetts.

In January, 2021, Omar Easy entered into negotiations to become the next Superintendent of Schools for Wayland, Massachusetts Public Schools. He began his term on July 1, 2021.

In February, 2023, Easy was placed on leave from the position of Superintendent of Schools for Wayland, Massachusetts Public Schools under allegations of misconduct.

References

External links
Profile at NFL.com

1977 births
Living people
People from Spanish Town
Sportspeople from Everett, Massachusetts
Jamaican players of American football
American football running backs
Penn State Nittany Lions football players
Kansas City Chiefs players
Oakland Raiders players
University of Phoenix alumni
School superintendents in Massachusetts